The 42nd Gawad Urian Awards was held on June 18, 2019 at the UPFI Film Center at the University of the Philippines. The best Philippine films for the year 2018 were honored in the event. 

Nominations were announced on May 9. Buy Bust received the most nominations with ten. Eddie Garcia and Anne Curtis received double nominations in their respective categories as Best Actor and Best Actress.

Buy Bust won four awards, including Best Picture. The Natatanging Gawad Urian was awarded to Gloria Sevilla.

Winners and nominees

Special award

Natatanging Gawad Urian 
 Gloria Sevilla

Multiple nominations and awards

References

Gawad Urian Awards
2018 film awards
2019 in Philippine cinema